Meridarchis longirostris is a moth in the family Carposinidae. It was described by George Hampson in 1900. It is found in Tibet.

References

Carposinidae
Moths described in 1900